Francis Wolff (April 5, 1907 – March 8, 1971) was a record company executive, photographer and record producer. Wolff's skills, as an executive and a photographer, were important contributions to the success of the Blue Note record label.

Career
Jakob Franz "Franny" Wolff was born in Berlin, Germany, where he became a jazz enthusiast, despite the government ban placed on this type of music after 1933.   After a career as a commercial photographer in Germany, Wolff emigrated to the United States. A Jew, he left Berlin for New York in the late 1930s. In 1939 in New York his childhood friend Alfred Lion had co-founded Blue Note Records (with sleeping partner Max Margulis, who soon dropped out of any involvement in the company), and Wolff joined Lion in running the company. During Lion's war service, Wolff worked for Milt Gabler at the Commodore Music Store, and together they maintained the company's catalogue until Lion was discharged.

Until Lion retired in 1967, Wolff concentrated on the financial affairs of the business and only supervised occasional recording sessions produced during his visits to Europe to see surviving members of his family.  For the last four years of his life, when Blue Note was no longer an independent label, Wolff shared production responsibilities with pianist and arranger Duke Pearson. He died of a heart attack following surgery in New York City, aged 64.

Wolff took photographs during the recordings sessions, usually shot during session rehearsals, throughout the period of Lion's involvement in Blue Note Records. They were used on publicity material and LP album sleeves, and have continued to be used in CD reissue booklets.  The two collections of photographs listed below contain entirely separate selections of the many thousands Wolff shot over a thirty-year period.

Reid Miles and Alfred Lion choose to leave the label in 1967 while Francis Wolff remains until his death which occurs on March 8, 1971 by a heart attack. Francis Wolff is considered one of the leading jazz photographers. His work has long remained unknown to the public; the publication in 1995 of a book entitled The Blue Note Years: The Jazz Photography of Francis Wolff, a compilation of his principal photographs for the label, helped to make his work more widely known.

Documentary films 
 Julian Benedikt: Blue Note – A Story of Modern Jazz. Documentary film, Germany 1996.
 Eric Friedler (film director): It Must Schwing! The Blue Note Story. Documentary film, Produzent: Wim Wenders, Germany 2018.
 Sophie Huber: Blue Note Records - Beyond the notes. Documentary film, Switzerland, 2018.

Bibliography 
 Michael Cuscuna, Charlie Lourie & Oscar Schnider (1995), The Blue Note Years: The Jazz Photography of Francis Wolff, Rizzoli, 
 Michael Cuscuna, Charlie Lourie & Oscar Schnider (2000), Blue Note: The Jazz Photography of Francis Wolff, Universe (Rizzoli),

References and notes

External links 
 Francis Wolff at Mosaic Records
 Blue Note Jazz Photography of Francis Wolff
 Family Tree on GENI

1907 births
1971 deaths
20th-century American photographers
Record producers from New York (state)
Jewish emigrants from Nazi Germany to the United States
Photographers from Berlin
Jazz photographers
Jazz record producers
Businesspeople from New York City
20th-century American businesspeople